Marek Strzaliński (born 7 October 1947 in Siedlce) is a Polish Politician. He was elected to the Sejm on 25 September 2005, getting 11,045 votes in 24 Białystok district as a candidate from the Democratic Left Alliance list.

See also
Members of Polish Sejm 2005-2007

External links
Marek Strzaliński - parliamentary page - includes declarations of interest, voting record, and transcripts of speeches.

1947 births
Living people
People from Siedlce
Democratic Left Alliance politicians
Members of the Polish Sejm 2005–2007
Recipients of the Order of the White Star, 2nd Class